Love at First Sight is a 1977 Georgian/Soviet comedy film by Lenfilm and Kartuli Pilmi (Romance/Drama).

Plot 
Film narrated about the first love of Murad Rasulov, an Azerbaijani ninth-former and a passionate football fan. He's in love with a girl two years older than him. This seemingly insignificant circumstance together with the girl's family tradition became a serious but brief obstacle for newlyweds.

The director's cut of the film released in 1988.

Cast 
 Vakhtang Panchulidze as Murad
 Natalya Yurizditskaya as Anya
 Ramaz Chkhikvadze	as Murad's father
 Kakhi Kavsadze as Murad's uncle
 Salome Kancheli as Murad's mother
 Vladimir Tatosov as Ashot
 Baadur Tsuladze as gardener
 Vladimir Nosik as Valera
 Robert Gorodetsky as Volodya

See also
 Love at first sight

External links

1977 romantic comedy films
Soviet romantic comedy films
Lenfilm films
Soviet-era films from Georgia (country)
Georgian-language films
Azerbaijani-language films
Kartuli Pilmi films
Comedy films from Georgia (country)
Multilingual films from Georgia (country)